Christopher Daniel Ryan (3 November 1879 – 2 May 1973) was an Australian rules footballer who played with Carlton in the Victorian Football League (VFL).

Notes

External links 

Chris Ryan's profile at Blueseum

1879 births
1973 deaths
Australian rules footballers from Victoria (Australia)
Carlton Football Club players
People from Kilmore, Victoria